Heltonville is an unincorporated community in Pleasant Run Township, Lawrence County, Indiana, United States.

History
Heltonville was platted in 1845. It was named for its founder, Andrew Helton, who had opened a store at the site some time before 1839. The Heltonville post office was established in 1846.

Education
Heltonville Elementary School, a school for students in kindergarten through fifth grade, educates approximately 100 students per year. In 2013, Heltonville Elementary received a rating of "1" out of 5 by the Indiana Department of Education.

Notable people
 Damon Bailey, NBA basketball player

References

Unincorporated communities in Lawrence County, Indiana
Unincorporated communities in Indiana